Nathan Athaydes Campos Ferreira (born January 18, 1994), known as Nathan, is a Brazilian professional footballer who plays as a winger for Marcílio Dias.

Career

Internacional
In Inter's youth always stands out, in 2011 turned out to be summoned by the Brazil U17. His professional debut took place on October 17, 2013, in game valid for Série A against the Santos by a score of 0–0.

References

External links
Nathan at Soccerway
Nathan at ZeroZero

1994 births
Living people
Sportspeople from Rio Grande do Sul
Brazilian footballers
Association football forwards
Sport Club Internacional players
Associação Atlética Ponte Preta players
Santa Cruz Futebol Clube players
Operário Ferroviário Esporte Clube players
Grêmio Esportivo Brasil players
Ceará Sporting Club players
Paraná Clube players
Goiás Esporte Clube players
Sociedade Esportiva e Recreativa Caxias do Sul players
Joinville Esporte Clube players
Londrina Esporte Clube players
Esporte Clube São José players
Campeonato Brasileiro Série A players
Campeonato Brasileiro Série B players
Campeonato Brasileiro Série C players